Oh Yoon-kyung  (born ) is a retired South Korean female volleyball player. She was part of the South Korea women's national volleyball team.

She participated in the 1994 FIVB Volleyball Women's World Championship. 
She attended Geunyeong Girls' High School (전주근영여자고등학교) in Jeonju, and went on to play for Honam Oil at the club level.

Clubs
 Honam Oil (1994)

References

1971 births
Living people
South Korean women's volleyball players
Korea National Sport University alumni
Place of birth missing (living people)
Asian Games medalists in volleyball
Volleyball players at the 1994 Asian Games
Asian Games gold medalists for South Korea
Medalists at the 1994 Asian Games